Louisa is an extinct town in southern Texas County, in the U.S. state of Missouri. The community was located along the South Prong of Jacks Fork Creek, southeast of Grogan.

A post office called Louisa was established in 1905, and remained in operation until 1923. An early postmaster gave the community the name of his wife, Louisa Embree.

References

Ghost towns in Missouri
Former populated places in Texas County, Missouri